This is a list of journalists killed in the Philippines, sorted by date of death.

Background

Statistics
Reporters Without Borders (RSF) had said that the Philippines is one of the world's deadliest country for journalists, adding that violence against them continued even with the establishment of the Presidential Task Force on Media Security (PTFoMS) in 2016. In its press freedom index for 2022, the country, out of 180 evaluated by RSF, ranks 147th. Prior to that, the 2009 Maguindanao massacre caused the country to be ranked 3rd in the Global Impunity Index by the Committee to Protect Journalists (CPJ) since then until 2014, the country's worst. In 2018, the country was given a special citation as one of those with an improved ranking. Likewise, the country was reported by the RSF as one of the five deadliest countries for journalists in the world from mid-2010s until being delisted in 2018. One of the causes is the PTFoMS' immediate action on various cases of killings and threats against the press.

Based on the data by the National Union of Journalists of the Philippines (NUJP), 197 media workers have been killed since 1986, with all deaths included were in relation to their job. The highest number was under the administration of President Gloria Macapagal Arroyo with 103; including 32 of those murdered in Maguindanao in what was called the world's worst single attack on journalists, which made the year 2009 the deadliest for them.

Meanwhile, other groups also document such. A data from the CPJ shows 156 killed since 1992; UNESCO reported 115 since 1996, with majority of them having publicized responses from Member States to Director General's request for information on judicial follow-up. Both includes the most recent, the death of Percy Lapid in October 2022.

Most deaths, according to NUJP, were radio personalities, especially blocktime commentators, many affiliated to local politicians, as suggested by a research from CPJ. Most incidents occurred in Mindanao, according to PTFoMS.

Various data show similarities seen in most of the killings. Incidents usually occurred in the provinces, wherein victims working there as journalists exposed wrongdoings in their locality. On the other hand, suspects, unknown and presumably hired killers, were hardly caught; very often they are motorcycle-riding assailants.

Both CMFR and the Philippine National Police reported in 2005 that of the journalists slain in the line or duty, seven were killed in crossfire: five during encounter with or being killed by the New People's Army (including two in an ambush in 1986); two during coup attempt especially in 1989 perpetrated by RAM–SFP–YOU.

The Center for Media Freedom and Responsibility (CMFR) has recorded, by April 2015, ten of those "killed in the line of duty since 1986" are women, four of them in the 2009 Maguindanao massacre case. Excluding more than a hundred arrested in connection with the 2009 murders, four alleged gunmen in two of the six cases were arrested, one of them has been released.

Data show few out of the cases of media killings since 1986 People Power Revolution having developments. Combined data from CMFR (Nov. 2014) and PTFoMS (Jan. 2020) show at least 53 of the cases resulted in convictions; CMFR reported, by Apr. 2016, six in acquittals. Meanwhile, CMFR recorded, by 2011, 54% of the monitored cases considered "cold or dead" where police have been unable to identify and arrest any suspect. Furthermore, both the Philippine Center for Investigative Journalism (PCIJ; in a February 2015 report) and CMFR stated that none of masterminds has been prosecuted and convicted.

PTFoMS, created through Administrative Order No. 1 issued by Pres. Rodrigo Duterte in October 2016, has been acting on the later cases; also, it has been gathering all data from various sources to map prior cases in the country and to exercise investigative powers on them; the results (shown at the table) until the 2019 verdict on the Ampatuan massacre case are recorded.

For those cases prior to 1986, various sources document such. According to the National Press Club (NPC), about 35 journalists were killed during the Marcos administration. NPC, as well as the military and a journalists' group in Manila, both reported more cases from mid-1984 to mid-1985, more than twice than the previous decade. Either military personnel or paramilitary units were the perpetrators in several cases. Few of these were said to be solved, few suspects were arrested, and at least a conviction was reported.

In 2006, Pres. Gloria Macapagal Arroyo created Task Force Usig following increase of murders of journalists and activists. While the supervisory body reportedly accomplished police reform and increased coordination, among others, it was criticized by media activists for failure to provide its logistics, as well as being toothless; as working from Camp Crame, relies on local police investigators vulnerable to political pressure.

"Media killings" defined
The term has various definitions:
 NUJP considers all media killings as work-related, assuming as such those cases that are uncertain if work-related or whose motives are unknown, unless there is proof otherwise.
 CMFR defines media killings "as the murder of journalists and media workers", anyone who works regularly in certain media and its aspects regardless of work quality or status, but with clarification on categorizing as work-related the cases of targeted killings due to their reports. The case is classified as "in the line of duty" regardless of reported certain abuses in the practice being provoked the killing. Meanwhile, while CMFR acknowledges a case that maybe not work-related, it finds any evidence to indicate such motives until it is verified, delisting the case.
 For TF Usig, a journalist's murder must be "work-related" to be considered a media killing.
 PTFoMS initially presumes all reported killings of media personnel as work-related and takes initiative in the investigation as a matter of protocol.

In the case of 32 journalists slain in 2009 in Maguindanao, they are said killed in the line of duty, thus recorded by both CMFR and NUJP. This is contrary to what was said by the TF Usig that the incident is considered to be election-related; they were not the target of the killers and are considered "collateral damage". Moreover, media activists had been concerned with the task force's count beginning from 2001 as they recorded only a few percent of those in the tally of CMFR and NUJP.

Pre-1980s
 Antonio Abad Tormis, Republic News editor and columnist, was shot on July 3, 1961, in front of the Masonic Temple building in Cebu City. Felipe Pareja, city treasurer at that time, had been the subject of Tormis' commentaries on graft. Pareja, the mastermind, and the gunman, Cesario Orongan, were convicted and imprisoned. This is the only such case in Cebu considered work-related.
 Celso Tan, DYRL commentator, was shot dead in May 1967 in his home in Bacolod City. He had been exposing in his program a criminal syndicate, which was later believed to be behind the killing. This is the first such killing in the city and the Negros Occidental area.
 Ermin Garcia Sr. of the Sunday Punch newspaper in Dagupan was shot dead sometime in late 1960s or early 1970s because of his fight against criminality.

1980s

Pre-1986
 Demosthenes "Demy" Dingcong, Lanao provincial correspondent of Bulletin Today, was shot by an unidentified gunman in his house in Iligan City, Lanao del Norte on December 5, 1980. He had wrote exposés about anomalies in the local government activities, including that on the missing fund intended for the students of Mindanao State University; also on military abuses, and the situation of the political prisoners in the province. He had already received threats from local officials.
 Geoffrey Siao, radio commentator and writer of the Philippine Post in Iligan City, was murdered on March 2, 1984.
 Atty. Florante "Boy" de Castro, lawyer and news commentator worked at DXCP, who had reported suspicious local government activities in South Cotabato, was gunned down on March 9, 1984, inside his house in General Santos.
 Vicente (Vic) Villordon, DYLA anchor, a critic of both government and communism, was shot by two gunmen on December 28, 1984, outside the station in Cebu City. Case has been unsolved. In a 2006 report by The Philippine Star, a former communist rebel claimed Villordon and Leo Enriquez III (killed in 1987), his former colleagues in the Communist Party of the Philippines–New People's Army (CPP–NPA), were killed by their comrades.
 Charles (or Charlie) Aberilla, DXWG (Iligan City) commentator, on April 29, 1985, was killed by three armed men who had entered the announcer's booth while on-air.
 Nabokodonosor "Nabing" Velez, 47, DYLA anchor-commentator in Cebu, was attacked by six gunmen on June 1, 1985, while watching a beauty contest. Case had been unsolved.
 Joselito Paloma, provincial journalist and publisher in Surigao, was fatally shot in his car on August 19, 1985.
 Eddie Suede, died 1985.
 Edgar Nagar of DXDC, Davao City.
 Gorge Batoctoy of defunct National Media Production Center, Davao City.
 Alexander Orcullo, worked for a newspaper in Davao, was shot down.
 Noe Alejandrino of Bulacan, one of the killed journalists, is claimed by the military as a Communist rebel leader who engaged soldiers in a firefight.

1986

1987

1988

1989

1990s

1990

1991

1992

1993

1995

1996

1997

1998

1999

Unknown date
 In early 1990s, Pedro "Pete" Dahan, DXUM block-timer announcer, was shot dead in Davao City. The killing was linked to various angles more than being a journalist.

2000s

2000

2001
RSF reported two work-related cases: that of Ureta and Cayona. On the other hand, RSF said that by year-end, the killings of two other journalists could not be established if work-related.

2002

2003
CPJ reported six work-related murders; all had been unsolved and none had been charged.

Pala, Juan "Jun"
Juan "Jun" Pala worked for DXGO in Davao City. He died on September 6.

Pala survived two earlier attempts on his life on June 14, 2001, and April 29, 2003.

At around 7 p.m. (local time), Pala was walking home with his bodyguard and cousin Roberto Porras and friend Fred Luas when attacked by unknown gunmen on board a motorcycle. They were some 300 metres from his house in Davao Empress Subdivision.
The three men were returning from the adjacent Vista Verde Subdivision, where Pala had been visiting a friend. Pala, who sustained nine gunshot wounds to various parts of the body, particularly the chest and arms, was pronounced dead on arrival at San Pedro Hospital. His companions were slightly injured and treated at the same hospital.

Pala's wife, Louise, said her husband aired critical commentaries against various government officials, including Mayor Rodrigo Duterte and President Gloria Macapagal-Arroyo. He had also exposed graft and corruption in the city involving some politicians. After the second attempt on his life, Pala claimed that Mayor Duterte was the most likely culprit.

Duterte declined to comment on Pala's death, saying only that any questions about the incident should be addressed to the police. "Today" also quoted him as saying that he "would be happy to submit to an investigation."

2004
RSF, noticing surge in violence in the election period, reported 2004, when general elections were held, as the deadliest year for the press at that time. That year and 2006 were the deadliest prior to the 2009 Maguindanao massacre, based on NUJP data.

Lumawag, Gene Boyd
Davao-based photojournalist Gene Boyd Lumawag was shot dead by an unidentified gunman in Jolo, Sulu on November 12. Lumawag, 26, was photographing the sunset at the pier in Jolo on the last day of Ramadan when he was killed by a single bullet to the head. Lumawag had traveled to Jolo with his MindaNews editor Carolyn Arguillas on November 10 to work on a video documentary about transparency and local governing practices for the U.S.-based Asia Foundation. Arguillas said they suspected Abu Sayyaf members were responsible for the killing.

2005

2006
Years 2006 and 2004 were the deadliest prior to the 2009 Maguindanao massacre, based on NUJP data.

2007

Lintuan, Ferdie
On December 24 at 9:40 a.m., Ferdie "Batman" Lintuan, after finishing his morning show, left DXGO, an AM station owned by the Manila Broadcasting Company, driving his Volkswagen with two colleagues when two men on board a motorcycle, wearing helmets with visors that hid their faces, attacked them. Lintuan, 51, was hit in his head and died while companions Louie Ceniza and Edgar Banzon were unhurt. Lintuan had been on the air at DXGO for about three months, leasing airtime under a practice known as "block-timing". The veteran journalist  also wrote for Sunstar Daily. Lintuan, 51, was well known for his criticism of local politicians in Davao City. Days prior to his death, Lintuan was attacking the city government, led by Mayor Rodrigo Duterte for its alleged anomalous People's Park, a local development project which he called the “Crocodiles’ Park.". The mayor denied the allegation linking him to the attack.
Duterte pointed to retired Army General Jovito Palparan, an adviser of rival Congressman Prospero Nograles, to have a hand in the killing.
 Lintuan had survived an August 1987 attack inside DXRA radio in Davao. Three others died in the attack.

2008

2009

Abas, Badrudin 
Badrudin Abas was a peace worker and block-time radio commentator in Cotabato City.

On January 21, 2009, while he was driving a red passenger multicab about 7 p.m., two unidentified motorcycle-riding gunmen shot him in the head. He died immediately. The police offered the theory that he was mistaken for his brother who is alleged to be involved in a love triangle. But the Committee to Protect Journalists (CPJ) voiced concerns that his killing may be just a continuation of the cycle of violence against journalists in the Philippines and called for a thorough investigation.

Like many of the journalists killed during the presidency of Gloria Macapagal Arroyo, Abas worked for local radio and had a reputation for strong commentary on Muslim and military issues.

Journalists killed in Maguindanao massacre
Thirty-two of them were among the 58 murdered on November 23, 2009 in Maguindanao as they accompanied the convoy of the family and supporters of opposition politician, then Buluan vice mayor Esmael Mangudadatu; and were about to cover the filing of candidacy on the latter's behalf for provincial governor for the 2010 election. They had departed from Mangudadatu residence and before reaching Shariff Aguak town, ruling Ampatuan's "private army" of approximately 200, allegedly led by Andal Ampatuan Jr. and with law enforcement authorities, at Ampatuan town, waylaid the group, as well as passers-by and diverted to a hill wherein they shot the victims dead, with their bodies and some of the vehicles later buried in the pits by clan members. Within few days, all were retrieved except a body of one journalist which remains missing. This incident is the world's single worst attack on the media members and the country's worst incident of electoral violence.

Fifteen of the 197 accused were members of the Ampatuan clan including the masterminds, former provincial governor Andal Sr., died July 2015, and his sons, Andal Jr. and Zaldy, former Autonomous Region in Muslim Mindanao governor. On December 19, 2019, in a verdict by Quezon City RTC, 28 principal respondents, including eight Ampatuan clan members especially the brothers, were convicted for 57 counts of murder, including 31 media workers, and were sentenced with reclusión perpetua without parole; 15 were sentenced to lower prison terms for being accessories to the crime.

By January 2020, four more accused, one of them among those acquitted, were under police custody; 77 remain at large.

2010s

2010
In the final month of the Arroyo administration, three radio journalists were killed. Desidario Camangyan was killed while hosting a singing contest at Manay, Davao Oriental on June 14. Within 48 hours, Joselito Agustin was murdered in Bacarra, Ilocos Norte, for his political reporting. Nestor Bedolido was the last journalist killed that month.

2011

2012

2013

2014

2015
 Nerlita "Nerlie" Ledesma, Abante tabloid reporter based in Balanga, Bataan, was shot and killed by unidentified motorcycle-riding gunmen on Jan 8 while she was on the way to work.
 Maurito Lim, dyRD, died Feb 14
 Melinda "Mei" Magsino, Philippine Daily Inquirer, died Apr. 13
 Gregorio (Gregory) Ybañez, publisher of weekly Kabayan News, president of Davao del Norte Press and Radio-TV Club (DNRPC), and a director of the National Electrification Administration (NEA) bloc, was fatally gunned down at his residence in Tagum City on Aug. 18. This was linked to the conflict between two DANECO factions.
 Teodoro Escanilla, broadcaster (DZMS) and human rights activist, was waylaid and shot on Aug 19 outside his home in Barcelona, Sorsogon.
 Cosme Diaz Maestrado, commentator (DXOC), was shot dead on Aug 27 in front of a shopping center in Ozamiz City, Misamis Occidental.
 Jose Bernardo; DWBL & DWIZ; Bandera Pilipino; died Oct 31

2016
 Elvis Ordaniza, dxWO FM, died Feb 16
 Alex Balcoba, People's Brigada, died May 27

Two cases in the first six months of Duterte administration were recorded by the NUJP.
 Apolinario Suan Jr. of Real FM, former President of the Barangay Chairmen of Bislig and provincial board Member; killed in Bislig, Surigao del Sur. Motive is inconclusive by mid-2018. He had been critical of the city mayor.
 Larry Que of Catanduanes News Now periodical, murdered in December in Virac, Catanduanes; had reported drug proliferation in Catanduanes. Case confirmed work-related. A resolution from the DOJ was issued, dismissing the murder complaint against five individuals for lack of evidence. In Feb. 2019, the provincial police turned over the investigation to a regional unit of the CIDG.

2017
Six deaths, all recorded by the NUJP, were also cited in a 2018 report by Vera Files. Three of them are confirmed work-related (That of Lozada is only considered the same by the PTFoMS):
 Joaquin Briones of Remate periodical, murdered on Mar. 13 in Milagros, Masbate. By 2018, four suspects were arrested for the killing. Possible motive was believed to be either local politics, which he had reported, or personal grudge.
 Leonardo (Leo) Diaz of Sapol News Bulletin periodical, also worked in Balita and Radio Mindanao Network; murdered on Aug. 7 in President Quirino, Sultan Kudarat; had reported on local corruption. According to the provincial police, the killing is possibly due to his personal affair and activities. An arrest warrant was issued by the Tacurong City RTC against one of the two accused.
 Christopher (Chris) Iban Lozada of DXBF–Prime Broadcasting Network, murdered on Oct. 24 in Bislig, Surigao del Sur; had reported local politics and corruption. By late 2019, suspects were indicted for the cases of murder and frustrated murder. Case is pending in court by early 2020.

Two others are confirmed non-work-related:
 Mario Contaoi of DZNS Radyo Totoo, former reporter and university professor; killed on Jan. 6 in Magsingal, Ilocos Sur; had reported local politics and environmental issues before he left the station in early 2016. Possible motive for the killing was a personal grudge.
 Rudy Alicaway, program host at DXPB-fm Radyo ng Bayan, incumbent barangay kagawad; shot and killed Aug. 6 in Molave, Zamboanga del Sur. The motive was disclosed most likely personal as he was linked in the death of a barangay chairman.

The motive of another case is reportedly inconclusive by mid-2018:
 Marlon Muyco, municipal administrative assistant in M'lang and, according to the police, a frequent guest in a program on DXND Radyo Bida Kidapawan City; killed in February in M'lang, Cotabato.

Other non-work-related cases include:
 Michael Marasigan (retired journalist, former reporter and editor of BusinessWorld; independent producer for the Living Asia Channel; public relations person): With his brother, died when attacked by two unknown motorcycle-riding gunmen in San Juan City on Aug. 3. Case endorsed for investigation by early 2020.
 Alexi Bolongaita, 29 (89.1 Power FM disc jockey): Shot dead inside her home at Cebu City on Sept. 21. A suspect, arrested in a hospital few hours later, admitted to the crime; charged with robbery and homicide, had been arraigned at the city RTC since 2018. Case classified as non-work-related.

2018
NUJP recorded four of those listed. The cases of Denora and Llana are considered work-related by the PTFoMS; that of Sestoso is confirmed the same by another source.
 Edmund Sestoso, anchorman of DYGB-fm Power 91 Dumaguete, was riding a pedicab on Apr. 30 in Dumaguete when gunmen riding in tandem opened fire at him; was in critical condition until his death in a hospital on May 1; had reported local issues. At least three witnesses identified the two suspects, including the gunman, said introduced themselves as NPA members, planned for the killing as Sestoso was alleged to be responsible for framing up another suspect, an NPA commander and uncle of the two, who had arrested in 2014 in Tanjay City. Murder charges were filed twice in 2018 against the three. The first, supported by various documentary evidences, was withdrawn by the victim's widow; the second was dismissed by the city prosecutor for lack of evidence. One of the suspects, Richard Bustamante Jr., died in a shooting incident in La Libertad in the same year; another was wounded. Police investigators sought a reopening of the case.
 Carlos Matas (volunteer broadcaster of DXCA-fm; retired soldier), died on the spot on May 12 in Labangan, Zamboanga del Sur when was ambushed by gunmen while riding on his way home to Pagadian City. Later in the afternoon, an operation was conducted by joint law enforcement personnel, with three suspects, as well as a policeman, killed; another suspect was wounded. Personal motive was reportedly the reason. Three more suspects remain at large by early 2020.
 Dennis Denora, publisher-editor of weekly Trends and Times (Panabo City) and DNPRC president, was shot dead by motorcycle-riding assailants on June 7 in Panabo City, Davao del Norte in what was suspected to be a politically motivated murder. He used to write a column for People's Daily Forum and Peryodiko Davao prior to setting up his own publication. Murder complaint and information were filed against a suspect and his unidentified companions. Case is pending in court by early 2020.
 Joey Llana, Home Radio Legazpi, declared dead two hours after being shot while on his way to work in Daraga, Albay on July 20. In 2019, an information for murder was filed against a suspect. The case is raffled at the RTC Legazpi City. Case is pending in court by early 2020.
 Gabriel Alburo, announcer of DYJL-fm Like Radio Guihulngan, candidate for councilor at Guihulngan City, Negros Oriental; shot to death (Dec. 28) by two unidentified gunmen riding in tandem while on his way home from the La Libertad cockpit arena. It was reported that the victim had an argument with a betting rival because of their bets. Investigation is ongoing by early 2020.

Non-work-related cases include:
 Jessie M. Cano, 50 (administrative aide at the government-owned DXSO Radyo Pilipinas Marawi; Army Reservist): Shot dead by unknown assailants before he arrived home in a village inside the MSU Campus, Marawi City, Lanao del Sur on June 23. Several possible angles were seen, including his work with the military, making him a possible target of Islamic State sympathizers.
 Manny Lacsamana, 51 (contributor to the regional monthly The Media Messenger; chairman of the board of a provincial chapter of the Central Luzon Media Association; businessman and property developer): Shot by unidentified motorcycle-riding gunmen, died upon arrival in a hospital in Cabanatuan on June 23. The murder was reportedly related to his work as a property developer and occurred over quarrying issue in the province.
 Julius Barellano, 35 (volunteer reporter for 101.5 Radyo Bandera Sweet FM Bacolod, disc jockey at Brigada News FM San Carlos City; chairman of a local chapter of the National Federation of Sugarcane Workers in San Carlos City): Died upon arrival at a hospital on June 27 after being shot by one of two unknown motorcycle-riding assailants in front of his house while leaving in San Carlos City, Negros Occidental. A personal grudge was revealed as the motive because of an argument between the victim and suspect.
 Nelvie Yu, 29 (reporter at 101.7 Spirit FM Baler, Aurora): Found dead in their residence in Dingalan, Aurora on Aug. 4. Her husband was considered a person of interest as the victim allegedly had an argument with him on the night before.
 Celso Amo, 66 (Bicol correspondent of The Philippine Star, Philippine News Agency stringer, also worked for the defunct Philippine Journal; editor-in-chief of city government publication The Windows; former regional information officer of the Philippine Information Agency): was stabbed to death at a basketball court in Daraga, Albay on Nov. 11 following an argument. Adam Johnson Abanes, charged with homicide, later pleaded guilty of death by tumultuous affray through the plea bargain; was sentenced to eight years in prison by the Legazpi City RTC in 2021.

2019
NUJP recorded three of those listed.
 John Michael Decano (part-time news correspondent, announcer of DWPY Pasalingaya FM in Sorsogon; beautician), found dead on Jan. 9 inside a parlor in Sorsogon City, Sorsogon. His death in what was appeared as robbery with homicide is not work-related.
 Francisco Patindol (DXJM-fm Butuan daily program blocktime commentator, former program director of its sister station DXCO-am Opol, Misamis Oriental; local coordinator of the Abante Mindanao partylist): On Apr. 20, he was stabbed by a drunk jeepney dispatcher who had got into an argument with him and his companion outside a photocopying center in Butuan City; he managed to walk to a nearby hospital where he later died.
 Eduardo Dizon, station manager and host at Brigada News FM Kidapawan station, was shot dead by motorcycle-riding gunmen while driving home on July 10 in Kidapawan City, Cotabato. He is critical of the Kapa controversy in his commentaries over his program, later said as the motive for the killing. A suspect-turned-eyewitness identified a local Kapa leader, also local broadcaster, as the mastermind. In late 2019, three other suspects were indicted for the murder in the Kidapawan RTC. One of them, also local broadcaster, later surrendered. Case is pending in court by early 2020.
 Dindo Generoso, DYEM-fm Bai Radio, died in November in Dumaguete. Charges were filed against suspect/s; case is pending in court by early 2020.
 Benjie Caballero, Radyo ni Juan, died in Tacurong City, Sultan Kudarat.

2020s

2020
 Cornelio Pepino, Original Energy 93.7 FM, murdered in May in Dumaguete.
 Jobert Bercasio, Balangibog, murdered Sep 14 in Sorsogon City, Sorsogon.
 Virgilio Maganes; DWPR, Northern Watch; murdered on Nov 10 in Villasis, Pangasinan. He was shot in a prior incident in 2016.
 Ronnie Villamor, Dos Kantos Balita, was gunned down on Nov 14 in Milagros, Masbate in an alleged encounter as authorities claimed. His colleagues denied the occurrence of that encounter.

2021
 Renante Cortes, dyRB, murdered July 22
 Orlando "Dondon" Dinoy; Newsline Philippines, Energy FM; died Oct 30
 Jesus Malabanan; Manila Standard, Manila Times, Bandera; murdered Dec 8

2022
 Jaynard Angeles, killed Jan. 12
 Jhannah Villegas; Sagad & Bugso, Radyo Ukay, Energy FM 106.7; murdered April 15, 2022
 Federico Gempesaw, Radyo Natin 106.3 FM CDO, died June 29
 Renato Blanco, Power 102.1 DYRY RFM Mabinay, murdered Sep 18
 Percival "Percy Lapid" Mabasa, DWBL 1242, murdered Oct 3

See also
Human rights in the Philippines (section Press freedom)
Extrajudicial killings and forced disappearances in the Philippines
Political killings in the Philippines (2001-2010)
List of assassinations in the Philippines

Notes

References

External links

Philippines, Arroyo
Arroyo
Journalists, killed